Elliot, officially known as Khowa, is a town in Chris Hani District Municipality in the Eastern Cape province of South Africa, and lies 80 km south-west of Maclear and 65 km south-east of Barkly East on the R56 road.

History
Originally the village was established in 1885 and known as Slang River, and in April 1894 was renamed Elliot, becoming a municipality in 1911. Named after Sir Henry George Elliot (1826-1912), Chief Magistrate of the Transkeian territories from 1891 to 1902. It was renamed Khowa in 2017.

People born in Khowa
 Mark Andrews (rugby player)
 Os du Randt (rugby player)

References

Populated places in the Sakhisizwe Local Municipality